Danger area may refer to:

The region of imminent danger from a tropical storm or hurricane; see 1-2-3 rule
The protected area of a cricket pitch, on which the bowler may not run in his follow-through